GameKeys are expansion modules made by Jakks Pacific for the purpose of adding games to GameKey-ready entries in their Plug It In & Play TV Games product line.

History

The GameKey was first announced at the 2005 International Toy Fair, and the first products were released in July 2005.

GameKeys were mainly marketed for the Namco Ms. Pac-Man controller, but different GameKeys existed for other TV Games manufactured by Jakks Pacific, including Nicktoons, Star Wars, and Disney. There were also GameKeys that never saw release due to market failure, such as Fantastic Four and Capcom.

GameKeys were discontinued in late 2006 after struggling for a year.

List of GameKey-Ready Controllers

External links 
 http://gear.ign.com/articles/588/588967p1.html
 http://toynewsi.com/index.php?catid=115&itemid=6156

Computer storage media
Handheld TV games